ADS or Ads may refer to:

 Advertising

In arts and entertainment
 ADS (TV station), Adelaide, South Australia
 "Aiming Down Sights",  video game term

In science and technology

In computing 
 Advanced Design System, electronic design automation software
 Alternate data stream in Microsoft NTFS
 Automated decision support, rule-based systems for management

In military use 
 ADS amphibious rifle
 Active Denial System, US non-lethal weapon
 Air Defence Ship, Indian aircraft carrier designation

Other uses in science and technology
 Accelerator-driven system, a type of subcritical reactor
 Adaptive Damping System, Mercedes  vehicle suspension
 Aitken Double Star Catalogue
 Anti–de Sitter space, a manifold in mathematics and physics
 Archaeology Data Service
 Astrophysics Data System
 Atmospheric diving suit
 Automatic dependent surveillance for tracking aircraft
 Automated driving system
 Autonomous Detection System for biohazards

Other uses 

 Adamorobe Sign Language, Ghana
 Addison Airport, Texas, US, IATA and FAA codes
 Adelaide Dolphin Sanctuary, a dolphin sanctuary in Adelaide, South Australia
 ADS (motorcycle), a Belgian manufacturer
 ADS Group, a British trade organisation
 Advanced Drainage Systems, a US company that manufacturers PVC pipes
 Agrarian Democratic Party, Czech Republic
 Alliance Data Systems, NYSE code
 American depositary share
 American Dialect Society, a learned society dedicated to languages in the US
 Ardrossan Harbour railway station, North Ayrshire, Scotland, station code

See also 
 AD (disambiguation)